Manuela Urroz (born 24 September 1991) is a Chilean field hockey player.

Urroz has been part of both the Chile junior and senior national teams. She made her junior debut at the 2008 Pan-Am Junior Championship, and her senior debut just a year later at the 2009 Champions Challenge.

References

External links

1991 births
Living people
Chilean female field hockey players
South American Games gold medalists for Chile
South American Games silver medalists for Chile
South American Games bronze medalists for Chile
South American Games medalists in field hockey
Pan American Games medalists in field hockey
Pan American Games bronze medalists for Chile
Field hockey players at the 2011 Pan American Games
Competitors at the 2014 South American Games
Competitors at the 2018 South American Games
Competitors at the 2022 South American Games
Field hockey players at the 2019 Pan American Games
Medalists at the 2011 Pan American Games
20th-century Chilean women
21st-century Chilean women